The R426 road is a regional road in Ireland, which runs north–south from the N80 in Portlaoise, County Laois to the N78 in Castlecomer, County Kilkenny.

See also
Roads in Ireland
National primary road
National secondary road

References
Roads Act 1993 (Classification of Regional Roads) Order 2006 – Department of Transport

Regional roads in the Republic of Ireland
Roads in County Laois
Roads in County Kilkenny